The Helali District is a district (bakhsh) in Joghatai County, Razavi Khorasan Province, Iran.

Population 
At the 2006 census, its population was 24,096, in 5,863 families.  The District has no city. The District has two rural districts (dehestan): Miyan Joveyn Rural District and Pain Jovin Rural District.

References 

Districts of Razavi Khorasan Province
Joghatai County